Wedding Palace may refer to:

 Gulustan Palace, formerly known as Gulustan Wedding Palace Complex
 Wedding Palace (Almaty)
 Wedding Palace (Ashgabat)
 Wedding Palace (Chernihiv)
 Wedding Palace (Tbilisi)
 Wedding Palace (film), 2013 South Korean film